Nadia Ghazzali (born April 3, 1961) is a Canadian statistician, the former president of the Université du Québec à Trois-Rivières, where she continues to work as a professor in the department of mathematics and computer science. As a statistician, she is known for her work on NbClust, a package in the R statistical software system for determining the number of clusters in a data set.

Education and career
Ghazzali was born on April 3, 1961, in Casablanca. After studying at the University of Rennes 1 in France, she came to Canada as a postdoctoral researcher at McGill University, and joined the faculty at the Université Laval in 1993.

She was president of the Université du Québec à Trois-Rivières from 2012 until 2015, when she resigned after facing criticism from the Auditor General of Québec over management practices in university construction.

Ghazzali is current (2021-2023) Deputy President of INWES, the International Network of Women Engineers and Scientists.

Recognition
At Laval, Ghazzali was given the NSERC Chair for Women in Science and Engineering in 2006. In the same year, she was named a corresponding member of the Hassan II Academy of Sciences and Technologies.

References

1961 births
Living people
Moroccan mathematicians
Canadian statisticians
Women statisticians
Academic staff of Université Laval
Academic staff of the Université du Québec à Trois-Rivières
R (programming language) people